Chowga is a village in Shangla District, Khyber Pakhtunkhwa, Pakistan.

Villages in Shangla District